AFL 360 is an Australian television talk show that covers current issues in the Australian Football League (AFL). It airs on Fox Footy at  Mondays to Wednesdays during the AFL season. It is hosted by Gerard Whateley and Mark Robinson, and features players, coaches and experts as regular guests.

History 
AFL 360 was launched as a weekly show on Fox Sports in 2010, airing on Wednesday nights, and continued as such in 2011. In 2012, the show moved to the re-launched Fox Footy channel, a sister channel to Fox Sports dedicated to AFL.

From 2012 to the beginning of the 2020 season, the show's regular schedule was each Monday to Thursday evening during the AFL season, except for Thursday nights on which an AFL match was played.

For the 2020 AFL season, when the AFL season recommenced after being suspended due to the due to the COVID-19 pandemic, the show's schedule became more flexible to fit in with the condensed AFL season, in which matches were played most nights each week but with varying start times.

Since the beginning of the 2021 regular season, the show has moved to a consistent Monday to Wednesday 7.30pm schedule, with Thursday night AFL matches becoming a more frequent fixture throughout the season. It returned to a Monday to Thursday schedule for the 2021 finals series.

Each year there is a special edition on the Thursday or Friday before the AFL Grand Final, and a final episode of the season on the Monday after the Grand Final.

The show has also aired additional episodes during the season under the AFL 360 banner, such as an extended interview between Whateley and Mick Malthouse in 2015, just days after he was sacked as Carlton coach. On select occasions, the show has returned to air in the off-season to cover major breaking news in AFL. This has included in October 2013 to cover Lance Franklin’s nine-year deal with the Sydney Swans, and in January 2016 following the final Court of Arbitration for Sport judgement in the Essendon Football Club supplements controversy. The show also aired a special Friday night edition on 3 July 2015 to cover the death of Adelaide Crows coach Phil Walsh.

In July 2018, regular Tuesday guests Jack Riewoldt and Jordan Lewis hosted an episode of the show as part of a "player takeover" promotion across various Fox Footy shows.

A special Sunday night edition aired on 22 March 2020, following the decision to suspend the 2020 AFL season due to the COVID-19 pandemic.

The show celebrated its 1,000th episode on 16 September 2020.

In July 2021, Mark Robinson took medical leave from the program, along with all other media roles, and did not return as co-host for the rest of the season. The details of his medical condition were not publicised  at the time. His co-hosting position was filled by a rotating roster of Fox Footy personalities. In the final episode of the year he appeared via video call and revealed that he had undergone emergency open heart surgery. He returned to his co-hosting role at the beginning of the 2022 season.

In April 2022, on the first Thursday night since the start of the season to not feature an AFL match, a new edition of the program called AFL 360 Extra was screened. This first edition was hosted by Kath Loughnan and co-hosted by Nick Riewoldt and Jack Riewoldt. This edition would later be called AFL 360 Plus.

Hosts
Gerard Whateley
Mark Robinson

Regular fill-in hosts

For Whateley
Kath Loughnan

For Robinson
Jason Dunstall 
Nick Riewoldt
Jonathan Brown
Garry Lyon

Former fill-in hosts
Jake Niall
Eddie McGuire
Mike Sheahan
Anthony Hudson

Regular guests

Segments

Regular
Monday hero (briefly Monday champion, when sponsored by McDonald's) - The hosts give their opinions on who were the heroes from the previous weekend's round of football.
Two minute scramble - The hosts give answers to several questions over two minutes
Tuesday matinee - The hosts select a non-football story that they enjoyed from the weekend
The Furnace (real or overreaction?) - The hosts decide whether a particular statement is real or an overreaction 
Rascal of the Week - Robert Murphy bestows "Rascal" status on a person guilty of mischievous behaviour. In 2017, this segment was taken over by Jack Riewoldt.
Wednesday love - The hosts select a person/club/event that they loved from the weekend
Looking forward to? - The hosts give their opinions on what they are looking forward to on the weekend
Weekend Forecast - The hosts suggest likely events/results that will occur over the weekend ("Sure Thing") and give scenarios that could happen on the weekend that would bring trouble or scrutiny onto a club or person ("Most at Stake" and "Doomsday Scenario"). Special guests often contribute to this segment.

Previous
Who would you rather be? - The hosts select two names each that have been in the news that week (for good or bad reasons) and pose the question "Who would you rather be?"
360 seconds - The hosts give answers to several questions over six minutes
The Bomber Diaries - Mark Thompson, in press conference style, takes questions from the hosts and viewers

Rascal of the Year
While Robert Murphy's Rascal of the Week concluded in 2014, he continued to present a Rascal of the Year award in grand final week until 2016. From 2017, Jack Riewoldt took over hosting the award. The winners are listed below. 

Notes
 Woods won the award as an Auskick player featured on a half-time broadcast

Awards and nominations

See also

 List of Australian television series
 List of longest-running Australian television series

References

External links
 

Fox Sports (Australian TV network) original programming
Fox Footy original programming
2010 Australian television series debuts
Australian rules football television series